R. indicus may refer to:
 Rakthamichthys indicus, the Malabar swamp eel
 Rallus indicus, the brown-cheeked rail
 Rewaconodon indicus, an extinct species of dromatheriid cynodonts
 Roseovarius indicus, a species of deep-sea bacteria

Synonyms
 Rhinoceros indicus, a synonym of Rhinoceros unicornis, the Indian rhinoceros

See also
 Indicus (disambiguation)